London Buses route 332 is a Transport for London contracted bus route in London, England. Running between Brent Park and Paddington station, it is operated by Metroline.

History
Route 332 commenced operating on 13 October 2007 replacing route 316 between Neasden and Cricklewood garage, then continuing to Paddington station, running parallel with route 316 to Kilburn High Road, and then via route 16 to Edgware Road station.
Upon being retendered, the route was retained by Metroline with a new contract to commence on 11 October 2014.

In November 2022, it was announced that the route would be withdrawn and replaced with a rerouted route 16.

Current route
Brent Park Tesco
Edgware Road
Cricklewood Broadway
Kilburn station 
Brondesbury station 
Kilburn High Road station 
Maida Vale station 
Edgware Road station 
Paddington station

References

External links

London Bus Routes gallery
Timetable

Bus routes in London
Transport in the London Borough of Brent
Transport in the London Borough of Camden
Transport in the City of Westminster